The Pere Marquette River is a river in Michigan in the United States.

This river is named after the French Roman Catholic missionary Jacques Marquette, who explored the Great Lakes and Mississippi River areas during the mid-17th century. He died in the vicinity of the river in spring 1675 on his way from Chicago to the French fort at Mackinaw.

National Wild and Scenic River designation
In 1978,  of the river was designated a National Scenic River. This section begins near Baldwin at the junction of the Little South and Middle Branches and continues until the river meets U.S. Highway 31 in Scottville.

Sport fishing 
The Pere Marquette River is designated a Blue Ribbon fishery.

Wildlife
This river's original native fish was the Grayling, but due to deforestation after the great Chicago Fire, they disappeared from the river.  It was then stocked with rainbow trout in 1876. In 1884, the Baldwin River, a major tributary, became the first American river to ever be stocked with European brown trout fish, which were imported from Germany, and is why they are referred to by some as German Brown Trout.

Other animal species living along this river
Chinook Salmon, successfully introduced in the 1960s
Coho salmon
Steelhead
Brook trout
Western chorus frog
Bullfrog 
Crayfish
Northern leopard frog  
Mudpuppy 
Eastern tiger salamander and several other species of salamander 
Northern water snake 
Copper-bellied water snake
Common snapping turtle
Red-eared slider 
Five-lined skink
Muskrat
Mink
Beaver
Weasel
Wood Duck
New Zealand mud snail, an invasive species
North American River Otter

Crossings

References

External links

 Pere Marquette River Michigan Department of Natural Resources

Rivers of Michigan
Rivers of Lake County, Michigan
Rivers of Mason County, Michigan
Rivers of Newaygo County, Michigan
Rivers of Oceana County, Michigan
Huron-Manistee National Forests
Tributaries of Lake Michigan
Wild and Scenic Rivers of the United States